Maria Dolors Renau i Manén (15 November 1936 – 29 August 2019) was a Spanish politician who served as a  Deputy and an MEP, as well as president of Socialist International Women (1999–2003).

Renau died in Sant Cugat del Vallès on 29 August 2019 at the age of 82.

References

1936 births
2019 deaths
Spanish politicians